Lee Young-yoo (born July 10, 1998) is a South Korean actress and singer. She was born in Osaka, Japan to Korean parents. Lee began her acting career as a child actress in 2003, and among her notable television dramas are Bad Housewife (2005), Bad Family (2006) and The Queen's Classroom (2013). She was also one of the vocalists of the K-pop all-girl children's group 7 Princess from 2004 to 2005; she left the band and released a single as a solo artist in 2008. She graduated from Sewon High School in 2017.

Filmography

Television series

Film

Television show

Music video

Discography

Awards and nominations

References

External links
 
 
 

1998 births
Living people
South Korean child actresses
South Korean female idols
South Korean television actresses
South Korean film actresses
School of Performing Arts Seoul alumni
King Kong by Starship artists